Sennar Airport is an airport serving Sennar in Sudan.

Sennar Airport is the most important airport of Sennar, Sudan. It is modern and one of the largest airports of Africa. Sennar Airport is important for people and government of Sudan.

References

Airports in Sudan